Andrew Michael Rourke (born 17 January 1964) is an English musician, best known as the bassist of the Smiths. He is known for his melodic approach to bass playing.

Career
Rourke's father was Irish while his mother was English. He received an acoustic guitar from his parents when he was seven years old. At the age of 11 he befriended the young John Maher (soon to be Johnny Marr) with whom he shared an interest in music. The pair spent lunch breaks in school jamming and playing on their guitars. When Marr and Rourke formed a band, he invited Rourke (still then a guitarist) to try on bass, which he fell in love with and has stuck with ever since.

Rourke left school when he was 15. He passed through a series of menial jobs and played guitar and bass in various rock bands, as well as in the short-lived funk band Freak Party, with his schoolfriend Johnny Marr.

Marr later teamed up with Morrissey to form the Smiths. Rourke joined the band after its first gig, and remained through most of its existence. Suffering from heroin addiction, he was sacked from the band in early 1986, rejoining two weeks later just before they released The Queen Is Dead. In his absence, second guitarist Craig Gannon joined the band. Marr described Rourke's contribution to that album as "something no other bass player could match". The Smiths released Strangeways, Here We Come in 1987 to critical acclaim, but split soon after.

Immediately after the break-up, Rourke and Smiths drummer Mike Joyce played with Sinéad O'Connor – Rourke (but not Joyce) appears on the album I Do Not Want What I Haven't Got (1990). Along with Craig Gannon, they provided the rhythm section for two singles by former Smiths singer Morrissey – "Interesting Drug" and "The Last of the Famous International Playboys" (both 1989). Rourke also played bass on Morrissey's "November Spawned a Monster" and "Piccadilly Palare" (both 1990) and composed the music for Morrissey's songs "Yes, I Am Blind" (the B-side of "Ouija Board, Ouija Board", 1989); "Girl Least Likely To" (a B-side on the 12-inch single of "November Spawned a Monster"; also released as a bonus track on the 1997 reissue of Viva Hate); and "Get Off the Stage" (the B-side of "Piccadilly Palare").

Rourke has also played and recorded with the Pretenders (appearing on some of the tracks on 1994's Last of the Independents); Killing Joke, Badly Drawn Boy (with whom Rourke toured for two years), Aziz Ibrahim (formerly of the Stone Roses), and ex-Oasis guitarist Bonehead as Moondog One, which also included Mike Joyce and Craig Gannon. Rourke also played bass for Ian Brown, both on tour and on Brown's album The World Is Yours.

Rourke and Joyce started legal proceedings against Morrissey and Marr over royalties. Short on money due to his heroin addiction, Rourke settled out of court for £83,000 and 10% of future royalties while relinquishing all further claims; Joyce pursued the claim until 1996 and was awarded substantially more in court. Having spent the settlement, Rourke later found himself being declared bankrupt following a petition of the Inland Revenue on 25 January 1999.

Rourke, his then-manager Nova Rehman, his production company, Great Northern Productions, and others organised Manchester v Cancer, a series of concerts to benefit cancer research, later known simply as Versus Cancer. The initiative was prompted when Rehman's father and sister were diagnosed with the disease. The first Manchester v Cancer concert took place in January 2006. It featured a reunion between Rourke and his former Smiths bandmate Johnny Marr, who performed one song together. The second Manchester v Cancer concert took place in March 2007. Rourke performed with former Oasis guitarist Bonehead's band Elektrik Milk. Rourke was less involved in organising the third concert in February 2008 or the fourth in December 2009.

Rourke formed Freebass with bass players Mani (ex-the Stone Roses) and Peter Hook (ex-New Order) in 2007 and remained active in the group until August 2010. Early in 2009, he moved to New York City, where he has a programme on East Village Radio and works as a club DJ with Olé Koretsky under the name Jetlag. This led to Rourke and Koretsky forming the band D.A.R.K. with singer Dolores O'Riordan from The Cranberries. The trio released their debut album, Science Agrees on 9 September 2016.

Equipment
Throughout his career, Rourke has used a Fender Precision Bass, Squier Precision Bass, Fender Jazz Bass, and a Yamaha BB2000; for amplification, he has used Peavey Mark III Head with Ampeg SVT cabinet and Trace Elliot GP-11.

Discography

The Smiths

Morrissey
Singles
"Piccadilly Palare"
"Interesting Drug"
"November Spawned a Monster"
"The Last of the Famous International Playboys"

Albums
 Bona Drag (1990)

FreeBass
Singles
"Live Tomorrow You Go Down" – 2010 – 24 Hour Service Station

EPs
Two Worlds Collide – 2010 – 24 Hour Service Station
You Don't Know This About Me (The Artur Baker Remixes) – 2010 – 24 Hour Service Station
Fritz von Runte vs Freebass Redesign – 2010 – 24 Hour Service Station
Two Worlds Collide (The Instrumental Mixes) – 2010 – 24 Hour Service Station

Albums
It's a Beautiful Life – 2010 – 24 Hour Service Station / Essential

D.A.R.K.
Science Agrees (2016)

Sinéad O'Connor
I Do Not Want What I Haven't Got (1990)

The Pretenders
Last of the Independents (1994)

Ian Brown
The World Is Yours (2007)

References

External links
 Official website
 Versus Cancer
 Forever Ill
 Pretenders 977 Radio
 "Andy Rourke Interview" YouTube.
 Vulgar Picture

1964 births
Living people
24 Hour Service Station artists
British indie pop musicians
British indie rock musicians
British alternative rock musicians
The Adult Net members
British people of Irish descent
English rock bass guitarists
Male bass guitarists
English rock guitarists
Musicians from Manchester
The Pretenders members
The Smiths members
Freebass members